is a Japanese manga artist who specializes in shōjo manga. Yū Yabuchi's most famous works are Mizuiro Jidai, Shōjo-Shōnen, and Naisho no Tsubomi. The main focus of her manga are the emotional and psychological growth of preteen girls and boys and early romances between them. Her works are popular among preteen and teenage girls. She received the 2009 Shogakukan Manga Award for children's manga for Naisho no Tsubomi.

Her favorites subjects to draw are trains and birds (especially the Java sparrow).

Works 
 Ani-Com
 Chiko no Negai
 Dolly Kanon
 EVE Shōjo no Tamago
 Gekikawa Devil
 Hatsukoi Shinan
 Hitohira no Koi ga Furu
 Karen
 Kimi ga Mai Orite Kita
 Kimi ni Straight
 Koi wo Kanaderu Kisetsu
 Mahochū!
 Midori no Tsubasa
 Mizuiro Jidai
 Naisho no Tsubomi
 Ocharakahoi
 Ojōsama ni wa Kanawanai
 Onegai! Maruchi-kun
 Pure Pure
 Shōjo Shōnen
 Sorairo Memorial
 Tonda Shinkiroku

References

External links 

Supporting Yū Yabuchi  (fansite, Japanese)

1969 births
Living people
Women manga artists
Manga artists from Hyōgo Prefecture
People from Nishinomiya
Japanese female comics artists
Female comics writers